The following is a list of flags of Vietnam.

National flag

Current

Official

Diasporic

Historical

Imperial standards

Personal standards of emperors

Presidential standards

Political flags

Religious flags

Military flags

Police flags

Ensigns

Flags of Vietnamese subjects

Provinces of the Nguyễn dynasty

Areas with special status and ethnic minorities

Other flags

Historical flags

Cultural flags

Monarchist flags

National flag proposals

Misattributed flags
This is a list of incorrect, fictitious or unknown flags which have been reported on as being factual and/or historical flags of Vietnam by contemporary or otherwise reputable sources.

"Flag of Cochinchina"

Others

Flag construction sheets

See also
  
 List of flags of French Indochina
 Vietnamese five-color flags

Notes

References

Lists and galleries of flags
 
Flags